The Mughan culture or the Talish-Mughan culture is an archeological culture of the late Bronze Age and the early Iron Age epoch (end of the 2nd – beginning of the 1st millenniums B.C.) in the Mughan plain and the Talysh Mountains in northwest Iran and Southeast Azerbaijan.

Characteristics

The characteristics of the Mughan culture are:

 Graves in stone boxes and in the graves.
 Graves can be single, clustered, joint – men and women buried together, with a rich and poor inventory.
 Cattle-breeding, agriculture and maybe fishing were the main occupations.
 Implements and weapons were made of bronze and iron.
 Weapons were bronze and iron swords with a bronze two-faucet hilt and bronze poniards with “framed handle” (of Western Asia type).
 Pottery was made by hand. A basket-shaped “censer” and dishes in shape of teapots were distinguished.

Grave inventories reflect a decomposition process of ancestral relations and property differentiation among tribes of the given culture.

References

Literature
 Пассек Т. и Латынин Б., Очерк до-истории Северного Азербайджана, "Известия Общества обследования и изучения Азербайджана", Баку, 1926, No 3;
 Morgan J., Mission scientifique en Perse, t. 1, P., 1894.

Archaeology of the Caucasus
Archaeological cultures of West Asia
Bronze Age cultures of Asia
Iron Age cultures of Asia
Archaeological cultures in Azerbaijan
Archaeological cultures in Iran
Indo-European archaeological cultures
Ancient history of Iran
History of Talysh